Ellen P. Reese (August 30, 1926 – April 2, 1997) was the Norma Cutts Dafoe professor of psychology at Mount Holyoke College until 1994.

She received her B.A. in psychology from Mount Holyoke in 1948 and her M.A. in 1954. The Ellen  P. Reese Grants for Faculty/Student Research has been established in her name. In 1997 Mount Holyoke held a conference dedicated entirely to her memory.

Awards
Reese was honored in 1986 by the American Psychological Association (APA) with the Distinguished Contribution to Education in Psychology Award. In 1992, the APA included her in a list of the 100 most important women in psychology.

References

External links
Obituary
In Memoriam
Reese Psychology and Education  Building
Ellen P. Reese Fund

20th-century American psychologists
American women psychologists
Mount Holyoke College alumni
Mount Holyoke College faculty
1926 births
1997 deaths
20th-century American women
20th-century American people
American women academics